The Young Philadelphians is a 1959 American legal drama film directed by Vincent Sherman and starring Paul Newman, Barbara Rush, Robert Vaughn and Alexis Smith. The film is based on the 1956 novel The Philadelphian, by Richard P. Powell.

Plot
Newlywed Kate Judson Lawrence (Diane Brewster) is distraught to discover on her wedding night that her upper-class Philadelphia Main Line husband, William (Adam West) never really wanted to marry her, when he says, "It was my mother who wanted this marriage, to give her a grandson. But I can't love you, Kate, I can't love anyone."

After William leaves her that night, she seeks comfort from longtime working-class friend and former beau Mike Flanagan (Brian Keith). The next day, Kate learns that William died of suicide in a car wreck. She gives birth to a son, Anthony Judson "Tony" Lawrence, and raises him in light of his last name.

Years later, Tony (Paul Newman) is a smart, ambitious college student working his way through school as a construction worker with his sights on becoming a lawyer. One day, he encounters socialite Joan Dickinson (Barbara Rush) when she has a minor car accident. They soon fall in love, though Joan is expected by nearly everyone in her lofty social circle to marry millionaire Carter Henry (Anthony Eisley). Their mutual friend, Chester "Chet" Gwynn (Robert Vaughn), warns her not to let social pressure separate her from the one she loves as it did him.

They decide to elope. However, Joan's father Gilbert Dickinson (John Williams) persuades Tony to postpone the wedding by offering him invaluable career help and a job at the highly esteemed law firm of which he is a full partner. Believing Tony has allowed himself to be bought, a disillusioned Joan sails to Europe. When Carter follows her, she marries him. Devastated and angry, Tony realizes that Joan's father wanted her to marry into another wealthy family, and only offered Tony help with his career in the hope of breaking them up. Tony then devotes himself to working his way up the social ladder and learning the game of the wealthy.

Fellow student Louis Donetti (Paul Picerni) tells Tony about a wonderful opportunity he has to assist John Marshall Wharton (Otto Kruger) in writing a law book. Tony becomes acquainted with Wharton's much younger wife Carol (Alexis Smith) and steals the job from his classmate. Living and working at Wharton's mansion, Tony impresses his employer with his expertise. Carol becomes attracted to him. She comes to his bedroom one night, but he cunningly defuses the dangerous situation by asking her to divorce her husband and marry him, knowing that she will be unwilling to do that.

Wharton offers Tony a job at his own prestigious firm. Tony accepts, deciding to specialize in the relatively new area of tax law, where there is more opportunity for rapid advancement. When the Korean War starts, interrupting his career, Tony serves as a JAG officer. Others are not as fortunate. Chet loses an arm in combat, and Carter Henry is killed.

Upon returning home, Tony gets a lucky break. Forced to work over the Christmas holiday, he is available when the very rich Mrs. J. Arthur Allen (Billie Burke) needs her will amended. With his specialized knowledge, he shows her how to avoid paying a great deal of taxes. Mrs. Allen responds by designating Tony to manage her finances, instead of her longtime lawyer Gilbert Dickinson. Tony also begins mending his relationship with Joan. Success after success follows, and Tony becomes well known and respected by the Philadelphia elite.

One night, Tony is called to the police station to pick up Chet, his disheveled, drunken friend. Donetti (now a public prosecutor) has Chet taken into custody and charged with the first-degree murder of Morton Stearnes (Robert Douglas), Chet's uncle and tight-fisted guardian of his inheritance. Chet insists on Tony defending him, fearing that his relatives, particularly family patriarch Dr. Shippen Stearnes (Frank Conroy), are more interested in avoiding a scandal than proving his innocence. Despite having no experience with criminal law, Tony reluctantly agrees. His work is further complicated when Shippen Stearnes threatens to reveal that Tony's real father is Mike Flanagan if Tony embarrasses the Stearnes clan. When Joan offers to hire a reliable attorney, Tony realizes that she fears that he has sold out once again.

At the trial, Tony discredits the testimony of George Archibald (Richard Deacon), Morton Stearnes' butler. He gets Shippen to admit that Morton had a brain tumor and was mentally depressed, and that he might have committed suicide. The jury finds Chet not guilty. After the trial, Tony and Joan reconcile.

Cast

 Paul Newman as Anthony "Tony" Judson Lawrence / Narrator
 Barbara Rush as Joan Dickinson
 Alexis Smith as Carol Wharton
 Brian Keith as Mike Flanagan
 Diane Brewster as Kate Judson Lawrence
 Billie Burke as Mrs. J. Arthur Allen, Owner Allen Oil Co.
 John Williams as Gilbert Dickinson
 Robert Vaughn as Chester A. "Chet" Gwynn
 Otto Kruger as John Marshall Wharton, Partner at the law firm of Wharton Biddle Clayton
 Paul Picerni as Louis Donetti
 Robert Douglas as Morton Stearnes
 Frank Conroy as Dr. Shippen Stearnes
 Adam West as William Lawrence III
 Anthony Eisley as Carter Henry
 Richard Deacon as George Archibald

Release
The film had its premiere at the Stanley Theatre in Philadelphia on May 19, 1959.

Reception
In its opening week, it finished second at the US box office, behind Some Like It Hot.

Accolades
The film is recognized by American Film Institute in these lists:
 2008: AFI's 10 Top 10:
 Nominated Courtroom Drama Film
Robert Vaughn was nominated for the Academy Award for Best Supporting Actor.

See also
 List of American films of 1959

References

External links
 
 
 
 

1959 films
1950s English-language films
1959 drama films
American drama films
Films about lawyers
Films scored by Ernest Gold
Films based on American novels
Films directed by Vincent Sherman
Films set in Philadelphia
1950s American films